Phu Khe may refer to:
Phou Khe, a mountain at the Lao and Thai border
Phú Khê, a village and commune in Vietnam